The 2002 United States Senate election in Maine was held November 5, 2002. Incumbent Republican U.S. Senator Susan Collins won re-election to a second term.

Candidates

Democratic 
 Chellie Pingree, State Senator and Senate Majority Leader

Republican 
 Susan Collins, incumbent U.S. Senator since 1997

General election

Campaign
Pingree attacked Collins for supporting the Bush tax cuts. Both candidates opposed the Iraq War in the fall of 2002. However, Collins then supported the congressional resolution to attack Iraq, while Pingree opposed it.

Collins, a popular moderate, was supported by health care groups, environmentalists and gay rights advocates. She handily defeated Pingree in one of the first U.S. Senate elections in which both major parties nominated women in U.S. history.

Debates
Complete video of debate, October 19, 2002

Predictions

Results

See also 
 2002 United States Senate election

References 

2002 Maine elections
Maine
2002